Sachin Nag (Bengali: শচীন নাগ;  5 July 1920 – 19 August 1987) was an Indian swimmer. He competed in the men's 100 metre freestyle at the 1948 Summer Olympics. He also competed in the water polo at the 1948 and 1952 Summer Olympics. He scored four goals on behalf of India. He won the first gold medal for India in the Asian Games when he won it in men's 100 metre freestyle swimming at the 1951 Asian Games in Delhi.

References

External links
 

1987 deaths
1920 births
Indian male swimmers
Indian male freestyle swimmers
Indian male medley swimmers
Indian male water polo players
Sportspeople from Varanasi
Sportspeople from Kolkata
Swimmers from West Bengal
Asian Games medalists in swimming
Bengali sportspeople
Bengali Hindus
Swimmers at the 1951 Asian Games
Asian Games gold medalists for India
Asian Games bronze medalists for India
Medalists at the 1951 Asian Games
Olympic swimmers of India
Olympic water polo players of India
Swimmers at the 1948 Summer Olympics
Water polo players at the 1948 Summer Olympics
Water polo players at the 1952 Summer Olympics
Recipients of the Dhyan Chand Award
20th-century Indian people